Qameshlu (also Romanized as Qameshlū, Gamīshlū, and Qamīshlū) is a village in Abgarm Rural District, Abgarm District, Avaj County, Qazvin Province, Iran. At the 2006 census, its population was 390, in 88 families.

References 

Populated places in Avaj County